Zoltán Miski (born 29 May 1983) is a Hungarian former professional football player.

Club career
Miski began his professional career with Héviz SE in the NB II, appearing in 15 matches during the 2005–06 season.  In January 2006, he transferred to Budapest Honvéd FC in the Hungarian NB I, where he appeared in 14 league matches over the next 18 months. Next, Miski moved to Sparta Prague of the Czech Gambrinus liga where he spent two unsuccessful seasons out on loan and never appeared in a league match.

References

External links
 Player profile on skcb.cz 

1983 births
Living people
Footballers from Budapest
Hungarian footballers
Association football goalkeepers
FC Fót footballers
Újpest FC players
FC Dabas footballers
Fehérvár FC players
FC Felcsút players
Hévíz FC footballers
Budapest Honvéd FC players
AC Sparta Prague players
SK Dynamo České Budějovice players
SK Kladno players
Ceglédi VSE footballers
Kazincbarcikai SC footballers
Jászberényi SE footballers
Nyíregyháza Spartacus FC players
Nemzeti Bajnokság I players
Nemzeti Bajnokság II players
Nemzeti Bajnokság III players
Hungarian expatriate footballers
Expatriate footballers in the Czech Republic
Hungarian expatriate sportspeople in the Czech Republic
21st-century Hungarian people